The 24th Battalion (Victoria Rifles), CEF, was an infantry battalion of the Canadian Expeditionary Force during World War I.

History 
The 24th Battalion was authorized on 7 November 1914 and embarked for Great Britain on 11 May 1915, arriving in France on 16 September 1915, where it fought as part of the 5th Infantry Brigade, 2nd Canadian Division in France and Flanders until the end of the war. The 24th Battalion was disbanded on 15 September 1920.

The 24th Battalion recruited and was mobilized at Montreal, Quebec.

The 24th Battalion had seven Officers Commanding:
Lt.-Col. J.A. Gunn, DSO, 11 May 1915 – 31 October 1916
Lt.-Col. R.O. Alexander, DSO, 1 November 1916 – 7 December 1916
Lt.-Col. C.F. Ritchie, 7 December 1916 – 14 April 1917
Lt.-Col. R.O. Alexander, DSO, 14 April 1917 – 4 August 1917
Lt.-Col. C.F. Ritchie, MC, 4 August 1917 – 22 January 1918
Lt.-Col. W.H. Clark-Kennedy, VC, DSO, 22 January 1918 – 28 August 1918
Lt.-Col. C.F. Ritchie, DSO, MC, 5 September 1918-Demobilization

One member of the 24th Battalion, Officer Commanding Lt.-Col. William Hew Clark-Kennedy, VC, CMG, DSO was awarded the Victoria Cross for his actions on 27 and 28 August on the Fresnes-Rouvroy line, France.

Perpetuation 
The 24th Battalion (Victoria Rifles), CEF, is perpetuated by The Victoria Rifles of Canada, currently on the Supplementary Order of Battle.

Battle Honours 

The 24th Battalion was awarded the following battle honours:

MOUNT SORREL
SOMME, 1916, '18
Flers-Courcelette
Thiepval
Ancre Heights
ARRAS, 1917, '18
Vimy, 1917
Arleux
Scarpe, 1917, '18
HILL 70
Ypres 1917
Passchendaele
AMIENS
HINDENBURG LINE
Canal du Nord
Cambrai, 1918
PURSUIT TO MONS
FRANCE AND FLANDERS, 1915-18

See also 

 List of infantry battalions in the Canadian Expeditionary Force

References

Sources
Canadian Expeditionary Force 1914-1919 by Col. G.W.L. Nicholson, CD, Queen's Printer, Ottawa, Ontario, 1962

External links

024
Military units and formations of Quebec
Victoria Rifles of Canada